Tarbagatayka is a rural locality (a selo) in Zaigrayevsky District, Republic of Buryatia, Russia. The population was 33 as of 2010. There is 1 street.

Geography 
Tarbagatayka is located 35 km south of Zaigrayevo (the district's administrative centre) by road. Karyernaya is the nearest rural locality.

References 

Rural localities in Zaigrayevsky District